Lucien Larre (born 1933 in St. Walburg, Saskatchewan) is a Canadian Roman Catholic priest with a doctorate in clinical psychology.  He is the founder of Bosco Homes, a Saskatchewan-based organization operating homes for troubled youth, and created the Big Valley Jamboree music festival as a fundraiser for Bosco Homes.

Honours
In 1983 Larre was named a member of the Order of Canada. In July 2008, he indicated his intention to resign his membership in the Order of Canada in protest of the appointment to the order of Dr. Henry Morgentaler. His resignation was accepted in January 2010.

Larre is the recipient of the Good Servant Award from the Canadian Council of Christians and Jews and of the William Kurelek Award from the (Canadian) Alliance for Life.

Abuse scandal
In 1992, Larre was convicted in Saskatchewan of physically abusing children in his care. He was acquitted on 9 of 11 charges, and obtained a pardon in 1997 and does not have a criminal record.

Dr. Larre v. College of Psychologists of BC
In June 2006 the Inquiry Committee of the College of Psychologists of British Columbia commenced an investigation into Larre concerning his fitness and competence to practice psychology.  The college appointed an American psychologist as an assessor.  In September this psychologist submitted a report recommending that Larre cease to practice as a psychologist.  In November the college approved the recommendation and invited Larre to resign from the college or to consent to the cancellation of his registration with the college.  Larre refused to resign or to consent to the cancellation of his registration.  On November 20, 2006, the Inquiry Committee suspended Larre's registration, noting "that there are serious public protection concerns and an immediate risk to the public".

Larre appealed his suspension to the Supreme Court of British Columbia.  On February 16, 2007, the court dismissed the appeal.

References

External links 
 
Biography of Lucien Larre, Encyclopedia of Saskatchewan

20th-century Canadian Roman Catholic priests
1933 births
Living people
Fransaskois people
Pardon recipients
21st-century Canadian Roman Catholic priests
Catholic priests convicted of crimes
Child abuse
20th-century Canadian psychologists
21st-century psychologists
Founders of charities
Music festival founders
Canadian founders